The 1993–94 Tampa Bay Lightning season was the Lightning's second season of operation. The team finished last in the Atlantic Division and did not qualify for the playoffs.

Offseason
Buoyed by an active off-season, confidence was high as the Lightning headed to Lakeland to prepare for the team's second National Hockey League season. The team was moved to the newly formed Atlantic Division in the Eastern Conference, prompting the beginning of several heated rivalries with East Coast teams such as Philadelphia and Florida.

Brian Bradley, fresh from an 86-point All-Star season, returned to lead the offense. Notably absent was Chris Kontos, who couldn't agree to a contract with the team. Offense, however, was expected to be a stronger area for the Lightning, with the off-season additions of flashy playmaker Denis Savard fresh off a Stanley Cup championship the previous season (free agent) and renowned sniper Petr Klima (trade with Edmonton). And with a move from Expo Hall across Tampa Bay to the Florida Suncoast Dome (soon renamed ThunderDome), the team was hoping the added stars would help fill the almost 30,000 seats available in St. Petersburg.

Another notable addition that would prove to be the most significant for the Lightning was the claim of veteran goaltender Daren Puppa from Florida in Phase II of the 1993 NHL Expansion Draft. Puppa, a former NHL All-Star with Buffalo, moved to the forefront in the Lightning net and posted a 22-33-6 record while the team allowed 81 fewer goals than in 1992-93.

Other notable additions to the Lightning lineup in 1993-94 included first-round draft choice Chris Gratton and a pair of heavyweights Tampa Bay fans would grow to love—Rudy Poeschek and Enrico Ciccone. Poeschek, a defenseman/forward signed as a free agent after time with the Rangers and Winnipeg, stepped into the enforcer role and immediately elicited chants of "Rudy" from ThunderDome crowds. Ciccone was acquired in a late-season deal that sent Joe Reekie to Washington, and "Chico" quickly teamed with Poeschek to form one of the most formidable tandems in the league.

Regular season
On the ice, the team couldn't match the hot start from 1992 to 1993, and quickly dropped to 3-12-2 by early November.  However, a bit of NHL history was made early in the season when the first regular-season game at the ThunderDome, which drew an NHL-record 27,227 fans to watch the Lightning face the Panthers on October 9, 1993. That attendance mark remains as the league record for a regular season game.  Also, that same month when the Los Angeles Kings came to town (October 20), NHL legend Wayne Gretzky faced his brother—Lightning 1992 draft choice Brent—for the only time in his career. Older brother Wayne got the better end of Brent this evening, helping Los Angeles to a 4-3 victory with a goal and an assist.
The season did, however, have its share of highlights.  The Lightning eventually began to show more consistency, and a 9-3-1 stretch through late December (a month that also featured the team's most successful road trip to that point, a 3–0 December swing through California that pushed the Lightning's record in the Golden State to a perfect 7-0.) and most of January put the Bolts back in the race.  The Bolts closed out the season with a 5-2 victory against Quebec at the ThunderDome and with high hopes for even more improvement in 1994-95.  Although they never managed to reach .500, the Lightning posted a marked improvement with seven more wins and 18 more points than the previous year.

In addition to being their first season in the ThunderDome, the team played four regular-season home games in Orlando at Orlando Arena.

The Lightning finished the regular season as the NHL's most disciplined team, being shorthanded only 335 times. They also allowed the most short-handed goals in the league, with 20.

Final standings

Game log
# Lightning home game played at the Orlando Arena

Player stats

Skaters

Goaltenders

† Denotes player spent time with another team before joining the Lightning. Stats reflect time with the Lightning only.
‡ Denotes player was traded mid-season. Stats reflect time with the Lightning only.

Note: GP = Games played; G = Goals; A = Assists; Pts = Points; +/- = plus/minus; PIM = Penalty minutes;
TOI = Time on ice; W = Wins; L = Losses; T = Ties; GA = Goals-against; GAA = Goals-against average; SO = Shutouts; SA = Shots against; SV% = Save percentage;

Awards and records

Transactions

Trades

Free agents

Waivers

Signings

NHL Expansion Draft

Phase I
The following two players were selected from the Tampa Bay Lightning roster in the 1993 NHL Expansion Draft:

Phase II
In the second phase of the Expansion Draft, Tampa Bay Lightning selected the following players from the Panthers and Mighty Ducks:

Departures

Draft picks
Tampa Bay's draft picks at the 1993 NHL Entry Draft held at the Quebec Coliseum in Quebec City, Quebec.

References
 

T
T
Tampa Bay Lightning seasons
Tamp
Tamp